Campo Municipal de Aterrizaje Airport  is an airport serving the town of Minas in Lavalleja Department, Uruguay.

There is a low hill just south of the runway.

See also

 List of airports in Uruguay
 Transport in Uruguay

References

External links
 OpenStreetMap - Minas
 OurAirports - Minas Municipal Airfield
 HERE Maps - Minas

Airports in Uruguay